David Joseph Nelson (26 February 1910 – 12 April 1986) was an Australian rules footballer who played with North Melbourne in the Victorian Football League (VFL).

Family
The son of David Guy Nelson (1870–1970), and Ellen Nelson (1880–1953), née Tighe, David Joseph Nelson was born in Collingwood, Victoria on 26 February 1910.

He married Patricia Mary McDonald (1917–1997) in 1939.

Military service
Nelson later served in the Australian Army during World War II.

Death
He died at his residence in Hawthorn, Victoria on 12 April 1986.

Notes

References
 
 [https://nominal-rolls.dva.gov.au/veteran?id=604313&c=WW2 World War Two Nominal Roll: Private David Joseph Nelson (V340383), Department of Veterans' Affairs.]
 B884, VX340383: World War Two Service Record: Private David Joseph Nelson (V340383), National Archives of Australia.

 External links 
 
 
 Dave Nelson's playing statistics from The VFA Project.
 Dave Nelson at Demonwiki''.

1910 births
1986 deaths
Australian rules footballers from Melbourne
Coburg Football Club players
North Melbourne Football Club players
Australian Army personnel of World War II
Australian Army soldiers
People from Collingwood, Victoria
Military personnel from Melbourne